Tindouf (Berber: Tinduf) is the main town, and a commune in Tindouf Province, Algeria, close to the Mauritanian, Western Saharan and Moroccan borders. The commune has population of around 160,000 but the census and population estimates do not count the Sahrawi refugees making the population as of the 2008 census 45,966, up from 25,266 in 1998, and an annual population growth rate of 6.3%.

The region is considered of strategic significance. It houses Algerian military bases and an airport with regular flights to Algiers as well as to other domestic destinations. Since 1975, it also contains several Sahrawi refugee camps operated by the Polisario Front, a national liberation movement seeking the self-determination of Western Sahara.

History 

The town of Tindouf was built near an isolated Saharan oasis in 1852 by members of the Tajakant tribe, but sacked and destroyed by the Reguibat, another Sahrawi tribe in 1895, and the Tajakant tribe were expelled from the region. It remained deserted until French troops arrived in the area in 1934. Since Algerian independence in 1962, the town has been deliberately built up, partly because of its importance as a last outpost before the Moroccan, Sahrawi and Mauritanian borders.

In 1963, the area was the scene of fighting between Algerian and Moroccan forces laying claim to western Algeria, in the Sand War. The region has since been heavily militarized, increasing its relevance. Since the mid-70s, the Tindouf region served as base for the Polisario Front, a Sahrawi nationalist organization fighting for Western Sahara's independence. The Polisario Front is headquartered in self-administered refugee camps south of the city, which filled up as Moroccan and Mauritanian forces conquered Western Sahara in 1975. During the war years of 1975–1990, Polisario forces struck in Western Sahara, Mauritania (until 1979) and southern Morocco (including the region of Tata), using the Tindouf region as their rear base area with Algerian protection and support. Since 1990 the area has been quiet, although the refugee community remains in Algeria, pending a UN-sponsored peace process and a referendum on independence. (See Minurso.)

Demographics 
Tindouf has a population of 47,965 (2010 estimates), though this figure is of questionable authenticity, given the fact that the exact number is a sensitive issue due to the Sahrawi refugees, who are excluded from the estimate.

Climate 

Tindouf has a hot desert climate (Köppen climate classification BWh), with extremely hot summers and very warm winters. There is very little rain for most of the year, generally concentrated in February and —associated with the West African Monsoon— by September–October. The region can be hit by rare events of heavy rain, such as in February 2006 or October 2015. Summer daytime temperatures commonly approach 45 °C (113 °F) with blazing sunshine, while winter nighttime temperatures can sometimes drop to 5 °C (41 °F) or less.

Education

6.1% of the population has a tertiary education, and another 18.8% has completed secondary education. The overall literacy rate is 75.0%, and is 79.7% among males and 70.1% among females.

Localities
The commune is composed of five localities:
Tindouf-ville
Garet Djebilet
Aouinet Bélagraa
Chenachène
Oum El Achar

References

External links

Communes of Tindouf Province
Province seats of Algeria
Populated places established in 1852